Ashley Phillips (born 26 June 2005) is an English footballer who plays as a centre-back for Blackburn Rovers.

Club career
In September 2021, it was reported that Phillips had agreed to a three-year professional contract with Blackburn to come into effect from his seventeenth birthday the following June. However, by August 2022, Blackburn manager Jon Dahl Tomasson said the contract had not yet been signed. 

Phillips was named in the starting XI for his professional debut in the EFL Cup in a 4–0 victory at home at Ewood Park against Hartlepool United on 10 August 2022.

On 14 August 2022, Phillips made his league debut in the game against West Bromwich Albion, playing 71 minutes in a 2–1 win.

On 20 September 2022, Phillips signed his first professional contract, committing his future to Blackburn Rovers until June 2025.

International career
On 9 April 2021, Phillips made his debut for Wales U16 coming off the bench in a 3-2 win against England U16.

On 1 October 2021, Phillips was called up to the England U17 squad.

On 16 September 2022, Phillips along with Rovers teammate Adam Wharton where called up to the England U19 squad, making his debut in a 2-0 win against Montenegro U19.

Style of play
Speaking in November 2021, then first team manager Tony Mowbray described Phillips as "phenomenal" and as well as being 6ft 4' tall he commented on his ball playing ability, stating: "He's fast, mobile and can pass it really well. He can use both feet, he's composed..if you were to create a defender in the mould of how you would want one, this kid has got every attribute.”

Career statistics

References

2005 births
Living people
English footballers
England youth international footballers
Blackburn Rovers F.C. players
English Football League players
Association football defenders
English people of Welsh descent